CBCC may refer to:

 CBCC-FM, a radio rebroadcaster (91.9 FM) licensed to Hearst, Ontario, Canada, rebroadcasting CBCS-FM
 CBCC-TV, a television retransmitter (channel 5) licensed to Hearst, Ontario, Canada, retransmitting CBLT

See also

 
 CBC (disambiguation)
 CBBC (disambiguation)
 CCBC (disambiguation)